Les Verchers-sur-Layon (literally Les Verchers on Layon) is a former commune in the Maine-et-Loire department in western France. On 30 December 2016, it was merged into the new commune Doué-en-Anjou.

Geography
The commune is traversed by the river Layon.

See also
Communes of the Maine-et-Loire department

References

Vercherssurlayon